Ouacif District is a district of Tizi Ouzou Province, Algeria.

Districts of Tizi Ouzou Province